Sacoila lanceolata, commonly referred to as leafless beaked orchid, is a species of flowering plant that grows in Florida the West Indies, Mexico, Central America, and South America. It grows in swamps and hydric hammocks including along roadsides. A varietal grows in South Florida.

References

Spiranthinae
Orchids of Central America
Orchids of Belize